Dummar is a municipal district of Damascus, Syria, located in the northwest of the city. It is the largest district of Damascus in terms of area.

History
The construction of the district was launched in the 1970s, with the first residents moved in during mid-1980s. Today it is a largely middle-class suburb home to many Damascene professionals.

The municipality includes the Kurdish neighborhood of Wadi al-Mashari (meaning Valley Projects)

Since the beginning of the Syrian Civil War, it was largely known as the safest area of Damascus, and was the site of a charity marathon for children with cancer.

Neighborhoods
Al-Arin (pop. 14,285)
Dahiyet Dummar (pop. 18,739)
Dummar al-Gharbiyah (pop. 30,031)
Dummar al-Sharqiyah (pop. 19,739)
Al-Wuroud (pop. 14,167)

References

Suburbs of Damascus